Jack James Earing (born 21 January 1999) is an English professional footballer who plays as a midfielder for Walsall.

Career
Earing came through Bolton's academy and made his debut for the team on 30 August 2016 when he started in a 2-0 home loss against Everton U-23s in the Football League Trophy Group Stage. On 12 January 2019, Earing was loaned out to Curzon Ashton. On 24 June 2019 it was announced that Earing would be joining FC Halifax Town when his Bolton contract expired on 1 July. On 18 December 2019, Earing joined Spennymoor Town on a short-term loan deal. On 23 January 2020, Earing joined Farsley Celtic on loan. On 18 June 2021, it was announced that Earing would join League Two side Walsall on a two-year deal on 1 July.

References

External links

Living people
1999 births
Footballers from Bury, Greater Manchester
Bolton Wanderers F.C. players
Curzon Ashton F.C. players
FC Halifax Town players
Walsall F.C. players
Spennymoor Town F.C. players
Farsley Celtic F.C. players
English Football League players
National League (English football) players
Association football midfielders
English footballers